Nagasawa (written: 長沢 lit. "long swamp" or 長澤) is a Japanese surname. Notable people with the surname include:

, Japanese sculptor and architect
Hiroaki Nagasawa (born 1958), Japanese politician
, Japanese judoka
Masahiko Nagasawa (born 1965), Japanese film director
Miki Nagasawa, Japanese voice actress
Masami Nagasawa (born 1987), Japanese actress
Nao Nagasawa (born 1984), Japanese actress
Naomi Nagasawa, Japanese voice actress
Nagasawa Rosetsu, 18th-century painter
Nagasawa Kanaye (1852-1934), Californian winemaker
Katsutoshi Nagasawa - composer
Kazuaki Nagasawa (born 1958), former Japanese football player
Kazuki Nagasawa (born 1991), Japanese football player
Kotoe Nagasawa (born 1950), Japanese ice skater
Shun Nagasawa (born 1988), Japanese football player
Tetsu Nagasawa (born 1968), former Japanese football player
Yoshiaki Nagasawa, Japanese bicycle builder
, Japanese footballer

See also
Keikyū Nagasawa Station, a railway station in Yokosuka, Japan
Nagasawa Station, a railway station in Funagata, Yamagata Prefecture, Japan

Japanese-language surnames